The following is an episode listing of the television program A Haunting for the Discovery Channel, Destination America, TLC Network and currently the Travel Channel, with the original air dates for the episodes included.

Series overview

Episodes

Specials (2002)

Season 1 (2005–06)

Season 2 (2006)

Season 3 (2006)

Season 4 (2007)

Season 5 (2012)
Starting with this season, the series airs on Destination America. It also features a new opening introduction and narration.

Season 6 (2013)

Season 7 (2014–15)

Season 8 (2016)
An eighth season of the show premiered on January 3, 2016. This season also features a new opening sequence.

Season 9 (2016–17)
Starting with this season, the show airs on the TLC Network.

Season 10 (2019)
Starting with this season, the show airs on The Travel Channel.

Season 11 (2021–22)
The eleventh season premiered on December 31, 2021, on both Discovery Plus and The Travel Channel.

DVD releases

References

Episode list using the default LineColor
Lists of American non-fiction television series episodes